The 2002 Waveney Council election took place on 2 May 2002 to elect members of Waveney District Council in Suffolk, England. The whole council was up for election with boundary changes since the last election in 2000. The Labour Party lost overall control of the council to no overall control.

Election result
Overall turnout in the election was 35.1%.

Ward results

Beccles North

Beccles South

Blything

Bungay

Carlton

Carlton Colville

Gunton and Corton

Halesworth

Harbour

Kessingland

Kirkley

Lothingland

Normanston

Oulton

Oulton Broad

Pakefield

Southwold and Reydon

St. Margaret's

The Saints

Wainford

Whitton

Worlingham

Wrentham

References

2002 English local elections
2002
2000s in Suffolk